NovaThor was a platform consisting of integrated System on Chips (SoC) and modems for smartphones and tablets developed by ST-Ericsson, a 50/50 joint venture of Ericsson and STMicroelectronics established on February 3, 2009. ST-Ericsson also sold the SoCs (Nova) and the modems (Thor) separately. The application processor portion of the system was the successor of the previous Nomadik line from STMicroelectronics.

History

In early 2009, when development had already begun on a Nomadik SoC called STn8500, it was superseded by the NovaThor family from ST-Ericsson and renamed U8500 as the ST-NXP Wireless division was merged into the ST-Ericsson joint venture.

On November 2, 2011, Nokia announced that NovaThor SoCs will power Nokia's future Windows Phone based smartphones, making a deviation from the standard use of Qualcomm Snapdragon SoCs in Windows Phones.

On February 28, 2012, ST-Ericsson announced that they would switch to fully depleted silicon on insulator (FD-SOI) transistors for upcoming products to reduce power consumption. As an example they stated that the L8540 SoC with FD-SOI transistors would consume 35% less power.

On April 23, 2012, the company announced that development of application processors (such as NovaThor) was to be moved back into STMicroelectronics.

On November 21, 2012, it was announced that ST-Ericsson had joined the Sailfish Alliance hence NovaThor ModAp platform would support Jolla's smartphones and Sailfish OS.

On December 10, 2012, ST-Ericsson announced that STMicroelectronics will leave the joint venture after a transition period making Ericsson the full owner of the company.

On December 20, 2012, Ericsson announced that they will not buy the remaining 50% stake that STMicroelectronics held. The future for the company therefore remained uncertain.

On January 30, 2013, ST-Ericsson announced as part of its quarterly result that they had shipped 10.7 million U8500 NovaThor units in the fourth quarter of 2012.

On May 28, 2013, ST-Ericsson announced that they would sell the assets and intellectual property rights for its mobile connectivity Global Navigation Satellite System (GNSS) to Intel for $90 million.

On August 5, 2013, Ericsson and STMicroelectronics completed the split up of ST-Ericsson and NovaThor is since a STMicroelectronics product.

List of Nova and NovaThor SoCs

Similar platforms
 Atom by Intel
 Apple silicon by Apple
 Exynos by Samsung
 OMAP by Texas Instruments
 Qualcomm Snapdragon
 Tegra by Nvidia

Notes

References

External links
 Page on ST-Ericsson website about NovaThor.
 PostmarketOS page for NovaThor phones - supports contemporary Linux kernels and userspace

ARM-based systems on chips